Sunil Vaswani (born 11 July 1963) is an Indian-born Nigerian billionaire businessman, and the chairman of the Stallion Group; a Dubai-headquartered company with diversified interests in cars, commodities, food, steel manufacturing, plastics, packaging, petrochemicals, port operations and technology. The group operates across Asia, the Middle East and Africa. As of January 2021, his net worth was estimated at US$1 billion.

Early life
Vaswani was born in Jaipur on 11 July 1963, the son of Sundar D Vaswani, grew up in Nigeria, and was educated in London. He is a graduate in economics and accounting from the United Kingdom. He was ranked No.1 in 2015 and 2016 by Forbes Middle East "Top Indian Leaders in the Arab World" 

His younger brothers Haresh and Mahesh also work for the company, in Dubai.

Career
Vaswani took over the Nigerian trading business from his father when he was 21.

In 2003, Vaswani moved to the UAE following legal disputes with the government for alleged duty evasion, which led to his deportation. No wrongdoing was found, and the Vaswani family was allowed to return.

In 2021, the Sunday Times Rich List estimated his net worth at £1.159 billion.

Personal life 
Vaswani and his wife Rita live in Dubai along with their youngest daughter Simran. His eldest daughter Sonam is married to Navin Fabiani.

Vaswani holds Nigerian and British passports. He is of Sindhi heritage.

References

1963 births
British billionaires
British people of Sindhi descent
Indian billionaires
Living people
Businesspeople from Jaipur
Nigerian people of Indian descent
Nigerian billionaires
Nigerian people of Sindhi descent
Naturalized citizens of Nigeria